Switzerland competed at the 1988 Summer Olympics in Seoul, South Korea. 99 competitors, 72 men and 27 women, took part in 83 events in 17 sports.

Medalists

Competitors
The following is the list of number of competitors in the Games.

Archery

In Switzerland's fourth appearance in Olympic archery, two women competed.

Women's Individual Competition:
 Vreny Burger — Preliminary Round (→ 39th place)
 Nadia Gautschi — Preliminary Round (→ 45th place)

Athletics

Men's Shot Put
 Werner Günthör
 Qualifying Heat — 20.70m
 Final — 21.99m (→  Bronze Medal)

Men's Javelin Throw 
 Rudolf Steiner
 Qualification — 76.02m (→ did not advance)

Men's Decathlon 
 Beat Gähwiler — 8114 points (→ 12th place) 
 100 metres — 11.18s
 Long Jump — 7.34m
 Shot Put — 14.48m
 High Jump — 1.94m
 400 metres — 49.02s
 110m Hurdles — 15.11s
 Discus Throw — 42.46m
 Pole Vault — 4.70m
 Javelin Throw — 65.84m
 1.500 metres — 4:16.74s

 Christian Gugler — 7502 points (→ 22nd place) 
 100 metres — 11.49s
 Long Jump — 7.02m
 Shot Put — 13.80m
 High Jump — 2.03m
 400 metres — 50.60s
 110m Hurdles — 15.22s
 Discus Throw — 39.08m
 Pole Vault — 4.70m
 Javelin Throw — 60.92m
 1.500 metres — 4:21.93s

 Severin Moser — 7502 points (→ 27th place) 
 100 metres — 11.10s
 Long Jump — 6.98m
 Shot Put — 12.69m
 High Jump — 1.85m
 400 metres — 48.63s
 110m Hurdles — 15.13s
 Discus Throw — 38.04m
 Pole Vault — 4.70m
 Javelin Throw — 49.52m
 1.500 metres — 4:21.90s

Women's Marathon 
 Genoveva Eichenmann
 Final — 2"44.37 (→ 47th place)

 Rosmarie Müller
 Final — 2"47.31 (→ 48th place)

Women's Javelin Throw
 Denise Thiémard
 Qualification — 61.74m
 Final — 58.54m (→ 9th place)

Women's Heptathlon 
 Corinne Schneider
 Final Result — 6157 points (→ 13th place)

Canoeing

Cycling

Nine cyclists, six men and three women, represented Switzerland in 1988.

Men's road race
 Marcel Stäuble
 Daniel Steiger
 Felice Puttini

Men's 1 km time trial
 Rocco Travella

Men's individual pursuit
 Bruno Risi

Men's points race
 Philippe Grivel

Women's road race
 Edith Schönenberger — 2:00:52 (→ 18th place)
 Barbara Ganz — 2:00:52 (→ 40th place)
 Brigitte Gyr-Gschwend — 2:00:52 (→ 41st place)

Diving

Equestrian

Fencing

Seven fencers, five men and two women, represented Switzerland in 1988.

Men's épée
 Patrice Gaille
 Michel Poffet
 André Kuhn

Men's team épée
 Patrice Gaille, André Kuhn, Zsolt Madarasz, Gérald Pfefferle, Michel Poffet

Women's foil
 Alessandra Mariéthoz
 Andrea Piros

Gymnastics

Judo

Modern pentathlon

Three male pentathletes represented Switzerland in 1988.

Men's Individual Competition:
 Peter Steinmann — 5181pts (→ 9th place)
 Andy Jung — 4951pts (→ 26th place)
 Peter Burger — 4731pts (→ 43rd place)

Men's Team Competition:
 Steinmann, Jung, and Burger — 14863pts (→ 7th place)

Rowing

Sailing

Shooting

Swimming

Men's 50 m Freestyle
 Dano Halsall
 Heat — 22.61
 Final — 22.83 (→ 4th place)

 Stéfan Voléry
 Heat — 23.04
 Final — 22.84 (→ 5th place)

Men's 100 m Freestyle
 Stéfan Voléry
 Heat — 50.96
 B-Final — 50.74 (→ 11th place)

 Dano Halsall
 Heat — 51.21 (→ did not advance, 23rd place)

Men's 200 m Freestyle
 Alberto Bottini
 Heat — 1:51.45 (→ did not advance, 20th place)

 Stéfan Voléry
 Heat — 1:52.94 (→ did not advance, 25th place)

Men's 400 m Freestyle
 Alberto Bottini
 Heat — 3:57.92 (→ did not advance, 25th place)

Men's 100 m Backstroke
 Patrick Ferland
 Heat — 58.17 (→ did not advance, 24th place)

Men's 200 m Backstroke
 Patrick Ferland
 Heat — 2:07.77 (→ did not advance, 29th place)

Men's 100 m Breaststroke
 Pierre-Yves Eberle
 Heat — 1:04.53 (→ did not advance, 21st place)

 Étienne Dagon
 Heat — 1:04.71 (→ did not advance, 27th place)

Men's 200 m Breaststroke
 Étienne Dagon
 Heat — 2:18.68
 B-Final — 2:18.17 (→ 13th place)

 Pierre-Yves Eberle
 Heat — 2:20.65 (→ did not advance, 25th place)

Men's 100 m Butterfly
 Théophile David
 Heat — 56.77 (→ did not advance, 30th place)

Men's 200 m Butterfly
 Théophile David
 Heat — 2:05.58 (→ did not advance, 33rd place)

Men's 4 × 100 m Medley Relay
 Patrick Ferland, Étienne Dagon, Dano Halsall, and Stéfan Voléry
 Heat — 3:48.09 (→ did not advance, 9th place)

Women's 50 m Freestyle
 Marie-Therese Armentero
 Heat — 26.32
 B-Final — 26.34 (→ 11th place)

Women's 100 m Freestyle
 Marie-Therese Armentero
 Heat — 57.35 (→ did not advance, 18th place)

Women's 100 m Backstroke
 Eva Gysling
 Heat — 1:05.07 (→ did not advance, 20th place)

Women's 200 m Backstroke
 Eva Gysling
 Heat — 2:24.61 (→ did not advance, 27th place)

Women's 100 m Breaststroke
 Patricia Brülhart
 Heat — 1:15.00 (→ did not advance, 30th place)

Women's 200 m Breaststroke
 Patricia Brülhart
 Heat — 2:42.82 (→ did not advance, 36th place)

Synchronized swimming

Three synchronized swimmers represented Switzerland in 1988.

Women's solo
 Karin Singer
 Edith Boss
 Claudia Peczinka

Women's duet
 Karin Singer
 Edith Boss

Tennis

Wrestling

References

Nations at the 1988 Summer Olympics
1988
Olympics